The 1990 Tipperary Senior Hurling Championship was the 100th staging of the Tipperary Senior Hurling Championship since its establishment by the Tipperary County Board in 1887. The championship began on 15 September 1990 and ended on 14 October 1990.

Clonoulty-Rossmore were the defending champions, however, they were defeated by Kilruane MacDomaghs at the quarter-final stage.

On 14 October 1990, Holycross-Ballycahill won the title after a 0-13 to 0-10 defeat of Cashel King Cormacs in the final at Semple Stadium. It was their fourth championship title overall and their first title since 1954. It remains their last championship title.

Holycross-Ballycahill's Stephen Dwan was the championship's top scorer with 2-20.

Participating teams

Results

Quarter-finals

Semi-finals

Final

Championship statistics

Top scorers

Top scorer overall

Top scorers in a single game

References

External links

 The County Senior Hurling Championship - 1990

Tipperary
Tipperary Senior Hurling Championship